KWMW (105.1 FM) is a radio station broadcasting a country music format. Licensed to Maljamar, New Mexico, United States, the station is currently owned by Mtd.

References

External links

Country radio stations in the United States
WMW